This is a list of venues used for professional baseball in Columbus, Ohio. The information is a compilation of the information contained in the references listed.

Baseball parks in Columbus 

name of ballpark unknown
Home of: Columbus Buckeyes – International Association (1877 only)

Recreation Park I
Home of: Columbus Buckeyes or Senators – American Association (1883–1884)
Location: Mound Street (north); Parsons Avenue (west); Meadow Lane (now Monroe Street) and 17th Street (east)
Currently: I-70 ramps

Recreation Park II
Home of:
Columbus Buckeyes – Ohio State League (1887 only)
Columbus Senators – Tri-State League (1888)
Columbus Solons or Colts – AA (1889–1891)
Columbus Reds or Senators (not confirmed) – Western League (1892 only)
Columbus Statesmen (not confirmed) – Inter-State League (1895 only)
Location: East Schiller (now East Whittier) Street (south, third base); Jaeger Street (west) or South 5th Street (farther west); Ebner Street (east, first base); East Kossuth Street (north, right field)
Currently: Giant Eagle supermarket and residences

Columbus Central Athletic Park or Columbus Baseball Park
Home of: Columbus Senators – Western League (1896 – mid-1899)
Location: Parsons Avenue; East Jenkins Avenue (south); Moler Street (north)

Neil Park I
Home of:
Columbus Senators – Inter-State League (1900 first half of season)
Columbus Senators or Discoverers – Western Association (1901)
Columbus Senators American Association (1902–1904)
Cleveland – American League for two home games: August 3, 1902; and May 17, 1903
Location: Buckingham Street (to the south, third base); 512 Cleveland Avenue and Fort Hayes (east, first base); stands moved from previous ballpark

Neil Park II
Home of:
Columbus Senators / Red Birds – AA (1905 – mid-1932)
Detroit Tigers – AL for two home games: July 23 and 24, 1905
Columbus Cubs (not confirmed) – Inter-State League (1913 only)
Columbus Buckeyes – Negro National League (1921 only)
Columbus Turfs (not confirmed) – Negro Southern League (1932 only)
Location: Buckingham Street (to the south, first base); 512 Cleveland Avenue and Fort Hayes (east, right field) same as Neil Park I; diamond moved, new stands built
Currently: Interstate Highway 670 and industrial buildings including Ross Laboratories, inventors of Similac

Cooper Stadium orig. Red Bird Stadium, then Jet Stadium, Franklin County Stadium
Home of:
Columbus Red Birds – American Association (mid-1932 – 1954)
Columbus Blue Birds – Negro National League (first half of 1933 only)
Columbus Elite Giants – Negro National League (1935 only)
Columbus Jets – International League (1955–1970)
Columbus Clippers – IL (1977–2008)
Location: 1155 West Mound Street (north, left field); Glenwood Avenue and Mount Calvary Cemetery (east, center field); Green Lawn Cemetery (south, right field); unnamed road lining up with Holton Avenue, on and off ramps for Interstate 70 (west, home plate) 
Currently: partially demolished, awaiting development

Bill Davis Stadium
Home of: Ohio State Buckeyes baseball (1997 to date)
Location: 650 Borror Drive (south, first base); parking lot and Fred Taylor Drive (west, first base); parking lot and Jack Nicklaus Drive (east, right field); athletic fields (north, left and center fields)

Huntington Park
Home of: Columbus Clippers – IL (2009 to date)
Location: 330 Huntington Park Lane (west, first base); Harold Cooper Lane / Brodbelt Lane (north, third base); Neil Avenue (east, left field); West Nationwide Blvd (south, right field);

See also 
 Lists of baseball parks

References 

 Peter Filichia, Professional Baseball Franchises, Facts on File, 1993.

External links 
Diagram of Neil Park

Columbus
 
Sports venues in Columbus, Ohio
Lists of buildings and structures in Ohio
baseball parks